Egon Wisniowski (born 19 February 1985) is a Belgian former professional footballer who played as a defender.

Career
In 2008, Wisniowski signed for Romanian second division side Progresul Bucureşti from STVV in the Belgian top flight, where he was injured.

In 2013, he signed for Belgian fourth division club Sporting Hasselt from Lommel in the Belgian second division, before joining Belgian eighth division team SK Herkenrode.

References

External links
 

Living people
1985 births
Belgian people of Polish descent
Belgian footballers
Association football defenders
Challenger Pro League players
Belgian Pro League players
Liga II players
Sint-Truidense V.V. players
FC Progresul București players
C.S. Visé players
Lommel S.K. players
Sporting Hasselt players
Belgian expatriate footballers
Belgian expatriate sportspeople in Romania
Expatriate footballers in Romania